Acraea rangatana is a butterfly in the family Nymphalidae. It is found in Kenya, Uganda, Rwanda, Burundi, the Democratic Republic of the Congo and Ethiopia.

Description

rangatana Eltr. (60 a) recalls the female of Acraea ventura, on the upper surface the dark marginal band of both wings is broader and the marginal spots are smaller and removed from the distal margin; the subapical band of the forewing is placed quite free and consists of three narrow whitish spots in cellules 4 to 6, of which the one in 6 is not half as long as the others; the ground-colour of the upper surface light ochre-yellow; hindwing beneath whitish yellow and marked almost as in ventura-, the red streaks in the basal part, however, united into a transverse band. British East Africa. -According to Trimen the larva is dull green with a white line on each side of the dorsum; dorsal and upper lateral spines black, the lower lateral spines yellow; head ochre-yellow; the first two dorsal spines projecting forwards and longer than the rest; lives on Hermannia and Triumfetta rhomboidea. Pupa whitish with the usual black markings; Fawcett has observed that pupae kept in dark boxes become slate-grey.

Subspecies
Acraea rangatana rangatana (Kenya: highlands east of the Rift Valley)
Acraea rangatana bettiana  Joicey & Talbot, 1921 (Uganda: south-west to Kigezi, Rwanda, Burundi, Democratic Republic of the Congo: northern Kivu)
Acraea rangatana ecketti  Jackson, 1951 (Kenya: highlands west of the Rift Valley)
Acraea rangatana maji  Carpenter, 1935 (south-western Ethiopia)

Biology
The larvae feed on Nesaea pediculata, Alchemilla gracilipes and Rotola species.

Taxonomy
Acraea rangatana is a member of the Acraea bonasia species group; see Acraea.
See also Pierre & Bernaud, 2014

References

External links

Images representing Acraea rangatana at Bold.
Images representing Acraea rangatana bettiana at Bold.
Images representing Acraea rangatana ecketti at Bold.

Butterflies described in 1912
rangatana